Jesus at the Gay Bar is the forthcoming fifth studio album by Australian pop group Cub Sport. The album was announced on 19 January 2023, alongside the album's third single "Keep Me Safe". The album title stems from Jay Hulme's poem published in his 2021 book The Backwater Sermons, that envisions Jesus Christ visiting a gay bar and being approached by a boy who "beg[s] to be healed", only to be told that "there is nothing in this heart of yours that ever needs to be healed". The album is scheduled for release on 7 April 2023.

Tim Nelson said "This is definitely our most dance-forward, party-centric album".

Promotion

Singles
"Always Got the Love" was released on 14 June 2022. Upon release, Nelson said, "I've always felt like the songs that people can cry to are important but I think being able to celebrate and move is equally important and that's kind of where I'm at right now. I wanna make music that makes people feel uplifted."

"Replay" was released on 11 November 2022 and was described by Alex Gallagher from NME as "a club-ready, house-influenced cut that marks the group's biggest venture yet into full-blown dance music."

The album's third single, "Keep Me Safe" is described as "a postcard to [Nelson's] former self", which he wrote "about a euphoric but complicated time" – when, before coming out as queer in 2017, he and keyboardist Sam Netterfield were forced to keep their relationship a secret.

"Songs About It" was released on 3 March 2023 as the album's fourth single.

Track listing

Release history

References

2023 albums
Cub Sport albums
Self-released albums